Miguel Ángel Zahzú (born 24 February 1966) is an Argentine football manager and former player who played as a goalkeeper.

Playing career
Born in Morón, Buenos Aires, Zahzú was a Vélez Sarsfield youth graduate, but never played for the club's first team. As a senior, he represented Atlético Lugano, Midland, San Telmo, Nueva Chicago, Laferrere, Colegiales, Argentino de General Pico and Lamadrid aside from a short period abroad with Chilean club Cobreloa.

Managerial career
After retiring, Zahzú worked as manager of Midland and Almirante Brown before joining Paraguayan side Nacional Asunción in 2003. He resigned from the latter in September of that year, but the club still won the División Intermedia.

On 23 April 2004, Zahzú took over River Plate Asunción also in the second division. On 30 October of that year, he was appointed General Caballero ZC manager, for the club's return to the Primera División.

On 8 November 2005, Zahzú replaced Hugo González at the helm of Sportivo Luqueño. On 7 July 2007, after winning the Apertura tournament, he was named in charge of Guaraní.

Despite being kept as manager of Guaraní for the 2008 season, Zahzú moved to Ecuador on 12 January of that year, after being appointed manager of Aucas. He left on a mutual agreement on 20 May, and returned to Paraguay on 2 July, to take over 3 de Febrero.

On 10 December 2008, Zahzú returned to Luqueño for the upcoming season, but resigned the following 13 June. During the 2010 season, he worked at 2 de Mayo, Cerro Corá and Sportivo Trinidense.

After managing Paraguayan sides 12 de Octubre, Sportivo Carapeguá and Colegiales, Zahzú was appointed at Bolivian side Aurora for the 2014 campaign. After working at fellow league teams San José and Nacional Potosí in the following years, he moved to Peru in 2016 with Deportivo Coopsol, before returning to his home country with Guaraní Antonio Franco.

Zahzú returned to Peru still in 2016, with Defensor La Bocana, but switched teams and countries again after taking over Dominican club Atlántico for the 2017 season. He returned to Aurora on 16 October 2017, but resigned the following 16 April.

In August 2018, Zahzú returned to the Dominican Republic, after being named Moca manager. He returned to Atlántico for the 2019 campaign, and was later in charge of Atlético Chiriquí also in the country.

On 4 September 2020, Zahzú was appointed at the helm of Delfín. Sacked on 3 December, he took over Carlos Stein in Peru eleven days later, but was still sacked on 31 May 2021.

Zahzú returned to Luqueño on 8 December 2021, with the club in the relegation play-offs. Despite suffering relegation, he remained at the club and helped them to return to the top tier at first attempt, but resigned on 23 October 2022.

On 24 November 2022, Zahzú was appointed manager of Resistencia in the Paraguayan top tier. He resigned the following 6 March, after just six matches.

Honours

Manager
Nacional Asunción
División Intermedia: 2003

Sportivo Luqueño
Paraguayan Primera División: 2007 Apertura

References

External links

1966 births
Living people
People from Buenos Aires Province
Argentine footballers
Association football goalkeepers
Club Atlético Lugano players
Club Ferrocarril Midland players
San Telmo footballers
Nueva Chicago footballers
Deportivo Laferrere footballers
Cobreloa footballers
Club Atlético Colegiales (Argentina) players
General Lamadrid footballers
Argentine expatriate footballers
Argentine expatriate sportspeople in Chile
Expatriate footballers in Chile
Argentine football managers
Club Nacional managers
Sportivo Luqueño managers
Club Guaraní managers
S.D. Aucas managers
12 de Octubre Football Club managers
Club Aurora managers
Club San José managers
Nacional Potosí managers
Delfín S.C. managers
Resistencia S.C. managers
Paraguayan Primera División managers
Bolivian Primera División managers
Argentine expatriate football managers
Argentine expatriate sportspeople in Paraguay
Argentine expatriate sportspeople in Ecuador
Argentine expatriate sportspeople in Bolivia
Argentine expatriate sportspeople in Peru
Argentine expatriate sportspeople in the Dominican Republic
Expatriate football managers in Paraguay
Expatriate football managers in Ecuador
Expatriate football managers in Bolivia
Expatriate football managers in Peru
Expatriate football managers in the Dominican Republic
Sportivo Trinidense managers